The 2001 Brabantse Pijl was the 41st edition of the Brabantse Pijl cycle race and was held on 1 April 2001. The race started in Zaventem and finished in Alsemberg. The race was won by Michael Boogerd.

General classification

References

2001
Brabantse Pijl